Huddersfield Town's 1975–76 campaign was the first season in the 67 years existence of the club, that the team had been in the fourth tier of the Football League. Under Bobby Collins and then Tom Johnston, Town managed a 4th round appearance in the season's FA Cup competition and a 5th-place finish in Division 4. Town managed to finish just one place and two points behind 4th-placed Tranmere Rovers.

Squad at the start of the season

Review
Following their third relegation in four seasons, Town started the 1975–76 season in the Fourth Division, a level never seen by the Terriers, or by any team who had won the First Division. The Board had decided to return Town to the all-blue kit. The early part of the season under Bobby Collins and general manager Tom Johnston saw Town make a steady early start to the campaign, which only seemed to have a minor falter between late October and just before Christmas saw Town lose 6 out of 10 games, although the other 4 in that run were wins. The strain of general manager Johnston took its toll on manager Collins, who resigned two days before Christmas, with Johnston taking over, making him the first man in the club's history to have the job twice (Although, that is strictly speaking untrue as Ian Greaves was caretaker manager in 1964, before taking the job on a full-time basis in  1968 .).

Under Johnston, Town went on a pulsating run in the FA Cup 4th round, which led to a match-up with Bolton Wanderers, now managed by Ian Greaves, which Town narrowly lost 1–0. But, near the end of the season, Town without top scorer Terry Gray and his strike partner Bobby Campbell were both out with broken legs. Town's form plummeted as they only won 1 of their last 12 league games, whereas if any 3 of those winless games had resulted in wins, Town would have got promoted back into Division 3 at the first attempt, but instead they found themselves languishing in the division for another 4 seasons.

Squad at the end of the season

Results

Division Four

FA Cup

Football League Cup

Appearances and goals

1975-76
English football clubs 1975–76 season